Patalene was an ancient area of Indian subcontinent, now in modern Pakistan, that corresponds to the area of Sind.

The Indo-Greeks are mentioned in ancient sources as having occupied the areas of the Patalene (Sindh) and Gujarat, including the strategic harbour of Barygaza (Bharuch), conquests also attested by coins dating from the Indo-Greek ruler Apollodotus I and by several ancient writers (Strabo 11; Periplus of the Erythraean Sea, Chap. 41/47):

Ptolemy mentioned Patalena in his Geographia:

Regions of Pakistan

See also
Regio Patalis

References

Ancient history of Pakistan